The 2015–16 Lesotho Premier League season is the top level of football competition in Lesotho. It began on 22 August 2015 and concluded on 12 May 2016.

Standings

References

Football leagues in Lesotho
Premier League
Premier League
Lesotho